Turbo was a South Korean dance-oriented group, mostly popular during the late 1990s to early 2000s. The group was originally a duo consisting of Kim Jong-kook and Kim Jung-nam. In early 1997, Kim Jung-nam left the group and Kim Jong-kook later continued promotion with new member Mikey. They became one of the biggest stars in the Korean entertainment industry during their active time between 1995 and 2001 and sold millions of albums and records across Asia. In 2015, they made a comeback as a trio after 15 years with "Again".

Career

1995–1996: Formation and early years 
Prior to Turbo's formation, Kim Jung-nam was a DJ while Kim Jong-kook was the vocalist for a high school band. With Jung-nam taking up rap and choreography and Jong-kook in charge of vocals, the group released their first album, 280 km/h Speed, in August 1995. The album sold over 300,000 copies by December of that year.

Just a year after their debut, Turbo returned with their second album, New Sensation. The album sold 800,000 copies within the first two months. After "Twist King" Turbo performed "Love Is...(3+3=0)" and "어느 재즈 바... (At the Jazz Bar...)". However, during the album's promotions, their company's CEO was revealed to have assaulted its singers and stolen hundreds of millions of won in profits, and Turbo went into seclusion. Kim Jung-nam, unable to reconcile his differences with the management, left the group, leaving Kim Jong Kook looking for a new partner.

1997–2001: Addition of Mikey and disbandment 
Auditioning against 3,500 other hopefuls, California resident Mikey was the one to become part of Turbo. With his addition, Turbo returned in October 1997 with their 3rd album, Born Again.... During this time, Turbo sang with American singer and movie star Will Smith for the Korean version of his fourth single "Just the Two of Us".

In September 1998, while preparing for their 4th album, Kim Jong-kook injured his hip, hampering the album's release. After a month-long rest, Kim returned to activities, and the album, entitled Perfect Love, was eventually released in October 1998.

On December 30, 1998, Turbo was invited to participate in the Asia Superconcert to represent South Korea. This concert featured singers from all over Asia including Japan, Hong Kong, Malaysia and Taiwan and was to broadcast live to South Korea, China and Japan. Kim Jong-kook received criticism for his lack of effort while lip-syncing and leaving without bowing during Turbo's performance. Due to this incident, Kim Jong-kook and Turbo's company were strictly warned and put under strong sanctions. The ban was lifted in October 1999, and 4 months later in 2000, Turbo returned with their 5th album Email My Heart.

On April 7, 2001, Turbo's agency Star Music announced that Kim Jong-kook had left the company due to contract expiration. To end their career, Turbo released one last album titled "History" revisiting all their hit songs from previous albums and including 3 new songs. A music video for "History" was also released, featuring transgender model and singer Harisu.

Reunion

Prior to the reunion, the group performed in many television shows like MBC's Infinite Challenge "Saturday, Saturday's: I Am a Singer Special" on December 27, 2014, on which they performed "My Childhood Dreams", "Twist King", "Love Is (3+3=0)" and "White Love". However, in this performance Kim Jung-nam is with Kim Jong-kook instead of Mikey. The group then performed again on January 25, 2015, one month after their last performance, on SBS's Inkigayo 800th episode special, performing "December" and "White Love". However, this time Mikey is performing with Kim Jong-kook instead of Kim Jung-nam.

In celebration of the group's 20th anniversary, all three previous members reunited for the first time in nearly 15 years in 2015. The group released their comeback album on December 21, featuring all three members. Their title song track "Again" features comedian Yoo Jae-suk, and the music video has many guest appearances, including Lee Kwang-soo and Cha Tae-hyun. On July 25, 2017, they released their first mini-album Turbo Splash, with "Hot Sugar" serving as the album's title track. They also appeared on many television variety shows like SBS's Running Man and KBS 2TV's Happy Together. Kim Jung-nam and Mikey also appeared on KBS 2TV's Hello Counselor.

Members
 Kim Jung-nam (김정남): 1995–1997, 2015–2017
 Kim Jong-kook (김종국): 1995–2001, 2015–2017
 Mikey (Jo Myung-ik) (마이키 (조명익)): 1997–2001, 2015–2017

Discography

Studio albums

Compilation albums

EP

Remix albums

Singles

Awards and nominations

References

External links 
 

South Korean dance music groups
South Korean pop music groups